Brush Tunnel is a   railroad tunnel located about  west of Corriganville, Maryland.

It was built in 1911 by the Western Maryland Railway, and is currently used by the Western Maryland Scenic Railroad, a tourist railroad running between Frostburg and Cumberland, Maryland, as well as the Great Allegheny Passage formerly known as the Allegheny Highlands Trail of Maryland rail trail). Some had expressed concern regarding the dual use of the tunnel, but time has shown that the scenic railroad and the bicycle trail can peacefully co-exist. There is a video camera showing east and westerly views mounted on the tunnel.  See the view at https://www.mountainmdtrails.org/gapwebcam 

The Allegheny Highlands Trail of Maryland is currently complete from Cumberland to near Pittsburgh, Pennsylvania, using mostly abandoned rail right-of-way. The portion of the trail from Cumberland to near Frostburg trail is adjacent to the active tourist line, including the tunnel.

As the tunnel was bored for two tracks, and the scenic railroad uses only one, there is sufficient room for the bicycle trail alongside in the tunnel, which is now lighted.  (However, trail users are cautioned not to be in the tunnel when a train is in or approaching the tunnel.)

References

 Western Maryland Railway Co., Baltimore, MD (1955). "Track Chart: Connellsville to Cumberland."

Tunnels in Allegany County, Maryland
Places located in Cumberland, MD-WV-PA
Railroad tunnels in Maryland
Western Maryland Railway tunnels
Tunnels completed in 1911
1911 establishments in Maryland